Nicolaas Pretorius (born 29 February 1984) is a South African professional rugby union player, who most recently played with the . His regular position is prop.

Career

Blue Bulls
However, he never made an appearance for the senior side.

Griffons
His Currie Cup debut came against the  during the 2006 Currie Cup First Division season.

Falcons
He became a regular with them the following season, making 18 appearances in the Vodacom Cup and Currie Cup competitions.

France
He then moved to France, where he remained for two seasons, playing for Biarritz during the 2008–09 Top 14 season and for Dax during the 2009–10 Rugby Pro D2 season.

Return to Falcons
He returned to South Africa in 2012, rejoining former side , making more than thirty appearances for them during the 2012 and 2013 seasons.

Griquas
He also played one match on loan at Kimberley-based side  during the 2013 Currie Cup Premier Division.

References

South African rugby union players
Living people
1984 births
Rugby union players from Pretoria
Falcons (rugby union) players
Griffons (rugby union) players
Griquas (rugby union) players
Rugby union props